Lycée Montaigne is a senior high school/sixth-form college in Bordeaux, France.

The Loi du 11 floréal de l’an X of 1 May 1802 established the school.

References

External links

 Lycée Montaigne 

Lycées in France
Bordeaux
1802 establishments in France
Educational institutions established in 1802